The 130th Maine Senate, convened on 2 December 2020 and adjourned sine die on 9 May 2022, had 35 members elected to two-year terms in the 2020 Maine State Senate election. The 130th Senate had 22 Democrats and 13 Republicans. It held four sessions: Two Regular Sessions and two Special Sessions. The First Regular Session convened on December 2, 2020 and adjourned on 30 March 2021. The First Special Session adjourned on 19 July 2021, and the Second Special Session adjourned on 29 September 2021. The Second Regular Session adjourned on 9 May 2022.

Leadership

Senators

Source:

Notes

See also
 List of Maine State Senators

References

External links
 Maine Senate

Maine legislative sessions
2020s in Maine
2020 in Maine
2021 in Maine